Galbus (also Romanized as Galbūs, Golboos, and Golbūs) is a village in Kolah Boz-e Sharqi Rural District, in the Central District of Meyaneh County, East Azerbaijan Province, Iran. At the 2006 census, its population was 388, in 79 families.

References 

Populated places in Meyaneh County